Étienne Marie Justin Victor Delbos (26 September 1862, Figeac – 16 June 1916, Paris) was a Catholic philosopher and historian of philosophy.

Delbos was appointed a lecturer at the Sorbonne in 1902. In 1911 he became a member of the Académie des Sciences Morales et Politiques. He died in July 1916 as a result of an infectious myocarditis brought on by pleurisy. Maurice Blondel, a close friend, wrote an obituary account of Delbos and saw various posthumous publications through the press.

He wrote on Spinoza, Nicolas Malebranche and Kant. A series of lectures on post-Kantian philosophy, which Delbos viewed as shaped by contingent psychological and social factors rather than through the unfolding of some internal logic, were published posthumously and later (1942) collected in a single volume.

Delbos was the father of the violinist and composer Claire Delbos. In turn, he was the father-in-law of Olivier Messiaen.

Works
Le problème moral dans la philosophie de Spinoza et dans l'histoire du spinozisme, Paris: Alcan, 1893
La Philosophie pratique de Kant, 1905
Le spinozisme : cours professé à la Sorbonne en 1912-1913, 1916
La philosophie française, 1919
Étude de la philosophie de Malebranche, 1924
De Kant aux postkantiens, 1942

References

External links
 

1862 births
1916 deaths
French historians of philosophy
Members of the Académie des sciences morales et politiques
19th-century French writers
19th-century French philosophers
20th-century French philosophers
French male non-fiction writers
Academic staff of the University of Paris
19th-century French male writers
Spinoza scholars